The 2011 Westcoast Curling Classic was held from October 7 to 10 at the Royal City Curling Club in New Westminster, British Columbia as part of the 2011–12 World Curling Tour. The purse for the event was CAD$80,000. The event was played in a triple knockout format.

Teams

Knockout results

A event

B event

C event

Playoffs

External links
Event Home Page

Westcoast Curling Classic
Westcoast Curling Classic
New Westminster
Curling in British Columbia